Wake Up Famous is a 1937 British musical comedy film directed by and starring Gene Gerrard. It was made at Shepperton Studios.

Cast
 Nelson Keys as Alfred Dimbleden  
 Gene Gerrard as Fink  
 Bela Mila as Agatha Dimbleden 
 Josephine Huntley Wright as Daisy  
 Fred Conyngham as Jack  
 H. F. Maltby as Sir Weatherby Watts 
 Bruno Barnabe
 Leo de Pokorny
 Joan White

References

Bibliography
 Low, Rachael. Filmmaking in 1930s Britain. George Allen & Unwin, 1985.
 Wood, Linda. British Films, 1927-1939. British Film Institute, 1986.

External links

1937 films
British musical comedy films
1937 musical comedy films
Films shot at Shepperton Studios
Films scored by Jack Beaver
British black-and-white films
1930s English-language films
1930s British films